Satterthwaite is a small village situated in Grizedale, a valley in the Lake District, England.

Satterthwaite can also refer to:

People

 Amy Satterthwaite (born 1986), New Zealand cricketer
 Charlie Satterthwaite (1877–1948), English football player
 Helen F. Satterthwaite (born 1928), American politician
 John Satterthwaite (born 1925), Church of England bishop whose dioceses were located outside England
 Joe Satterthwaite (born 1885, date of death unknown), English footballer
 Joseph C. Satterthwaite (1900–1990), American politician
 Linton Satterthwaite (1897–1978), American archaeologist and epigrapher specialising in the Maya
 Mark Satterthwaite (born 1945), economist at the Kellogg School of Management at Northwestern University in Evanston, Illinois
 Phyllis Satterthwaite, British tennis player

Law Case
 New Zealand Shipping Co. Ltd. v. A. M. Satterthwaite & Co. Ltd. or The Eurymedon, is a leading case on contract law which clarifies when a third party may seek the protection of an exclusion clause in a contract between two parties.

Mathematics
 The Gibbard–Satterthwaite theorem, is a result about voting systems. 
 The Myerson–Satterthwaite theorem is an important result in mechanism design and the economics of asymmetric information.
 The Welch–Satterthwaite equation is an equation in statistics relating to the degrees of freedom of a linear combination of independent sample variances.